The Osterman and Tremaine Building is a historic building in Fremont, Nebraska. It was built as a two-story commercial structure in 1884 for Osterman and Tremaine, a wholesale firm of produce co-founded by Charles Osterman, a German immigrant, and George S. Tremaine. It was designed by architect Charles F. Driscoll, with a metal cornice. It was acquired by Ideal Steam Laundry, Johnson & Co. in 1894, and it closed down in 1963. By the mid-1970s, it housed law offices. It has been listed on the National Register of Historic Places since May 23, 1978.

References

	
National Register of Historic Places in Dodge County, Nebraska
Buildings and structures completed in 1884